Northwest Symphony Orchestra may refer to:

Northwest Symphony Orchestra (Chicago) 
Northwest Symphony Orchestra (Burien) 
Northwest Indiana Symphony Orchestra